Terry Austin may refer to:
Terry Austin (footballer) (born 1954), English footballer
Terry Austin (comics) (born 1952), American comic book artist
Terry Austin (politician) (born 1955), American politician from Virginia